The IFIP International Conference on Formal Techniques for Distributed Objects, Components and Systems (FORTE) is part of the federated conference event DisCoTec (Distributed Computing Techniques) which also includes the International Conference on Coordination Models and Languages (COORDINATION) and the IFIP International Conference on Distributed Applications and Interoperable Systems (DAIS).

Until 2013, the conference was held as IFIP Joint International Conference on Formal Techniques for Distributed Systems and consisted of the two conference series FMOODS and FORTE.

Scope

The joined conference FMOODS/FORTE is a forum for fundamental research on theory, models, tools and applications of distributed systems. The conference solicits original contributions that advance the science and technologies for distributed systems, in particular in the areas of:

component- and model-based design
object technology, modularity, software adaptation
service-oriented, ubiquitous, pervasive, grid, cloud and mobile computing systems
software quality, reliability, availability and security
security, privacy and trust in distributed systems
adaptive distributed systems, self-stabilization
self-healing/organizing
verification, validation, formal analysis and testing of the above

Contributions that combine theory and practice and that exploit formal methods and theoretical foundations to present novel solutions to problems arising from the development of distributed systems are encouraged. This conference covers distributed computing models and formal specification, testing and verification methods. The application domains include all kinds of application-level distributed systems, telecommunication services, Internet, embedded and real-time systems, as well as networking and communication security and reliability.

Previous Conferences

Web pages
 FORTE 2014
 FMOODS / FORTE 2013
 FMOODS / FORTE 2012 is offline
 FMOODS / FORTE 2011
 FMOODS / FORTE 2010 is offline
 FMOODS / FORTE 2009
 FMOODS 2008 / FORTE 2008 is offline
 FMOODS 2007 / FORTE 2007
 FMOODS 2006 / FORTE 2006
 FMOODS 2005 / FORTE 2005
 FORTE 2004
 FMOODS 2003 is offline / FORTE 2003 is offline
 FMOODS 2002 / FORTE 2002
 FORTE 2001 is offline
 FMOODS 2000 / FORTE 2000 is offline
 FMOODS 1999 is offline / FORTE 1999
 FORTE 1998
 FMOODS 1997 is offline / FORTE 1997 is offline
 FMOODS 1996 / FORTE 1996 is offline

Proceedings
FMOODS / FORTE 2013 (LNCS 7892)
FMOODS / FORTE 2012 (LNCS 7273)
FMOODS / FORTE 2011 (LNCS 6722)
FMOODS / FORTE 2010 (LNCS 6117)
FMOODS / FORTE 2009 (LNCS 5522)
FMOODS 2008 (LNCS 5051) / FORTE 2008 (LNCS 5048)
FMOODS 2007 (LNCS 4468) / FORTE 2007 (LNCS 4574)
FMOODS 2006 (LNCS 4037) / FORTE 2006 (LNCS 4229)
FMOODS 2005 (LNCS 3535) / FORTE 2005 (LNCS 3731)
FORTE 2004 (LNCS 3235)
FMOODS 2003 (LNCS 2884) / FORTE 2003 (LNCS 2767)
FMOODS 2002 (IFIP ACIT) / FORTE 2002 (LNCS 2529)
FMOODS 2000 (IFIP ACIT)
FMOODS 1999 (IFIP ACIT)
FORTE 1997 (IFIP AICT)

Notes 

Distributed computing conferences